Dong Fang Hong was a space satellite program in the People's Republic of China.

Dong Fang Hong ("the East is red") may also refer to:
Dong Fang Hong I, China's first satellite
Dong Fang Hong 02, a geostationary television satellite
China Railway Dong Fang Hong locomotives:
China Railways DFH shunting locomotives
China Railways DFH mainline locomotives
 A subdistrict of Yuelu District, Changsha
 Dongfanghong Square in Lanzhou

See also
The East Is Red (disambiguation)